Bean snail is a common name of snail species including
 Melampus coffea, the coffee bean snail
 Partula faba,  Captain Cook's bean snail

See also
Snail bean, a species of vine

Animal common name disambiguation pages